Queen's or Queens campus may refer to:

 Queen's Campus, Durham University in Stockton-on-Tees, England
 Queens Campus, Rutgers University in New Brunswick, New Jersey
 Queens Campus, St. John's University in Queens, New York
 The main campus of Queen's University at Kingston in Kingston, Canada
 The campus of Queen's University Belfast in Belfast, Northern Ireland
 The campus of Queens University of Charlotte in Charlotte, North Carolina

See also
 Queen's College (disambiguation) (including Queens' and Queens)
 Queen's University (disambiguation) (including Queens)
 Queens (disambiguation) (including Queen's)